Sir Kenneth Lloyd Gibson, 2nd Baronet (11 May 1888 – 14 May 1967) was an English cricketer who played for Essex from 1909 to 1912.

Gibson was born in Kensington, London, and educated at Eton College. He appeared in 42 first-class matches as a right-handed batsman and wicketkeeper. He scored 959 runs and took 62 catches and 11 stumpings. His fullest season was 1911, when in 20 matches he scored 533 runs at an average of 19.74 and took 35 catches and 6 stumpings. He made his highest score of 75 that season against Surrey.

He was the second Gibson baronet of Great Warley, a title he inherited on the death of his father, Sir Herbert Gibson, the first baronet (1851–1932). He married Mary Edith Elwes in February 1914; they had two daughters. While serving with the Dragoon Guards in World War I he was mentioned in despatches. He was Clerk of the Course at Sandown Park Racecourse in the 1950s.

References

External links
 
 

1888 births
1967 deaths
Sportspeople from Kensington
People educated at Eton College
English cricketers
Essex cricketers
Marylebone Cricket Club cricketers
Gentlemen cricketers
British Army cricketers
British Army personnel of World War I
Carabiniers (6th Dragoon Guards) officers
Baronets in the Baronetage of the United Kingdom
Military personnel from London